Jerry Baker may refer to:
Jerry Baker (author) (1931–2017), American author, entrepreneur, public speaker and product spokesperson
Jerry Baker (announcer), American sports announcer
Jerry Baker, see Custody battle for Anna Mae He
Jerry Baker (American football), American football player

See also
Gerry Baker (disambiguation)
Jeremy Baker (disambiguation)
Jerome Baker (disambiguation)